The 2016–17 New Mexico Lobos men's basketball team represented the University of New Mexico during the 2016–17 NCAA Division I men's basketball season as a member of the Mountain West Conference. They played their home games at The Pit in Albuquerque, New Mexico. The Lobos were led by fourth-year head coach Craig Neal. They finished the season 17–14, 10–8 in Mountain West play to finish in fifth place. They lost in the quarterfinals of the Mountain West tournament to Fresno State.

On March 31, 2017, head coach Craig Neal was fired after 4 seasons with the Lobos, 3 weeks after New Mexico Athletic Director Paul Krebs had stated that Neal would return next season. The school then hired Paul Weir from their in-state rival New Mexico State as the new head coach on April 11.

Previous season
The Lobos finished the 2015–16 season 17–15, 10–8 in Mountain West play to finish in a tie for fourth place. They lost in the quarterfinals of the Mountain West tournament to Nevada.

Offseason

Departures

Incoming transfers

2016 recruiting class

Roster

Schedule

|-
!colspan=12 style=| Exhibition

|-
!colspan=12 style=| Non-conference regular season

|-
!colspan=12 style=| Mountain West regular season

|-
!colspan=12 style=| Mountain West tournament

References

New Mexico Lobos men's basketball seasons
New Mexico
2016 in sports in New Mexico
2017 in sports in New Mexico